Daasebre Nana Osei Bonsu II, also known as Saint Oswald Gyimah-Kessie (born 31 December 1939) served as the regent of the Kingdom of Ashanti from 25 February 1999 to 26 April 1999. Osei Bonsu II is the Mamponghene (Dukeof the Ashanti-Mampong Municipality).

Biography

Early life and education
Osei Bonsu II was educated at Prempeh College and at the University of Ghana, where he graduated in 1972 with a BA in economics, political science and modern history. Osei Bonsu II became the registrar of the Kwame Nkrumah University of Science and Technology, Ashanti, in 1991.

Duties
As Chairman of the Energy Commission, Nana Osei Bonsu II attracted criticism in 2005 over Commission funds that were used to buy new cars for himself and the Commission's Secretary, Kofi Asante.

See also
Rulers of the Kingdom of Ashanti
Kingdom of Ashanti

References

1939 births
Living people
Ashanti monarchs